The Nesmith–Greely Building is a four-story historic structure located at 825 5th Avenue in San Diego's Gaslamp Quarter, in the U.S. state of California. It was built in 1888. It is located next to the Louis Bank of Commerce.

History
The building was designed by N.A. Comstock and Carl Trotsche. The construction cost was $32,000 ($ today). The building's interior was refurbished in 1971.

See also
 List of Gaslamp Quarter historic buildings

References

External links

 

1888 establishments in California
Buildings and structures completed in 1888
Buildings and structures in San Diego
Gaslamp Quarter, San Diego